Roger Federer defeated Gaël Monfils 6–3, 7–6(7–5) to win the 2006 Qatar Open singles tennis tournament. He did not lose a single set in the entire tournament.

Seeds

Draw

Finals

Section 1

Section 2

External links
 Singles draw
 Qualifying draw

2006 Qatar Open
Qatar Open (tennis)
2006 ATP Tour